Stephen Fitzmaurice is an Irish mixer and producer based in London, England. His credits include albums for Depeche Mode, Seal, Sam Smith, Ian Brown, Kylie Minogue, Sting, Paloma Faith, Olly Murs, The Kooks, Alicia Keys, U2, Hikaru Utada, and Mr.Children.

As a teenager, Fitzmaurice moved from Dublin to London, where he began working at Sarm Studios with producer Trevor Horn and mixer Julian Mendelsohn. He later moved to New York  where he worked on records by Jodeci, Eric Clapton and young upcoming artists, including Timbaland and Missy Elliott.

Since becoming a freelance mix engineer and producer, Fitzmaurice has won and been nominated for multiple Grammy Awards. Fitzmaurice co-produced and mixed the first ever Number One James Bond track and Oscar-winning song, "Writing's On The Wall". He also mixed Falling Slowly by The Frames, which won an Academy Award for Best Original Song at the 80th Academy Awards.

Awards
Seal - Kiss from a Rose - Record Of The Year - Grammy Winner
U2 - All That You Can't Leave Behind - Best Rock Album - Grammy Winner
Sam Smith - Stay with Me - Record Of The Year - Grammy Winner
Sam Smith - In the Lonely Hour - Best Pop Album - Grammy Winner

Songwriting and production credits

References

External links 
 
 Steve's Management
 Steve's Studio

Year of birth missing (living people)
Living people
Grammy Award winners
Irish record producers